Tony Fernández (1962–2020) was a Dominican baseball player.

Tony Fernandez may also refer to:

Tony Fernandez (musician) (born 1946), English drummer
Tony Fernandez (ophthalmologist), Indian ophthalmologist

See also 
Tony Fernandes (born 1964), Malaysian entrepreneur